Aberdeen was a census-designated place (CDP) in Palm Beach County, Florida. The population was 2,672 at the 1990 census.  It now serves as a neighborhood in the vast swathe of undifferentiated suburbia that is west of Boynton Beach, Florida. Although the Census Bureau no longer recognizes Aberdeen as a census-designated place, the neighborhood continues to exist and prosper.

References

Former census-designated places in Palm Beach County, Florida
Former census-designated places in Florida